Vusovich is a Belarusian surname. Notable people with the surname include:

Ilona Vusovich (born 1982), Belarusian sprinter
Sviatlana Vusovich (born 1980), Belarusian sprinter, sister of Ilona

See also
Vukovich

Belarusian-language surnames